The Blueberry Hunt is an Indian-Canadian thriller film directed by Anup Kurian and starring Naseeruddin Shah, Vipin Sharma, Aahana Kumra, PJ Unnikrishnan, Yadu Sankalia, Vinay Forrt, and Kartik Elangovan. The film had a nationwide theatrical release in India on April 8, 2016.

Plot
The Blueberry Hunt unfolds in a lush green deserted estate bordering the forest on the high altitudes of Vagamon, Kerala. The film centers around a recluse locally known as "Colonel"—played by Naseeruddin Shah, living with his large German Shepherd dog. The story focuses on the last five days when Colonel's plantation of a high potency variant of marijuana—Blueberry Skunk—gets ready for harvest.

Cast

Production
The film was shot on location in Vagamon, Kerala.

References

External links 
 

2016 films
2010s Hindi-language films
Films about the illegal drug trade
Canadian thriller films
Indian thriller films
Indian films about cannabis
Canadian films about cannabis
2010s English-language films
2010s Canadian films
Indian multilingual films
Canadian multilingual films